Fernand Kashama (born February 26, 1985) is a former Canadian football defensive lineman who played in the Canadian Football League (CFL). He was drafted by the Calgary Stampeders in the second round of the 2008 CFL Draft. He played college football for the Western Michigan Broncos. He also played for the Winnipeg Blue Bombers.

Early years
Kashama was born on February 26, 1985, in Kinshasa, Congo and grew up in Brampton, Ontario. During his senior season in high school, he played both wide receiver and free safety. He recorded 30 catches for 700 receiving yards.

College career
Kashama was recruited by Boise State, Marshall, Rutgers and Western Michigan, before eventually choosing the latter. He enrolled at the university in January 2004. He redshirted in his true freshman season in 2004. During his redshirt freshman season in 2005, he started off on the offensive scout team before being activated. After playing at tight end for Western Michigan in 2005 and 2006, he converted to defensive lineman in 2007. In his first season at the position he played in all 12 games and recorded his first career sack against Temple on November 24. Overall in his junior and senior seasons which were spent playing on the defensive line, he had 14 tackles along with the one sack.

Professional career

Calgary Stampeders
Kashama was selected by the Calgary Stampeders in the 2008 CFL Draft with the 16th overall pick. He returned to Western Michigan in 2008 for his senior season before signing with Calgary on May 8, 2009. Kashama was originally listed as a linebacker when he joined Calgary but converted to fullback for the season.

Winnipeg Blue Bombers
On October 8, 2010, Kashama signed as a free agent with the Winnipeg Blue Bombers for the remainder of the 2010 season.

Personal
Kashama's older brother Alain, also plays for the Stampeders. His other brother Hakeem played for three CFL teams and his cousin Tim Biakabutuka played for the NFL's Carolina Panthers. Kashama also has a younger brother Bronley who will attend Eastern Michigan University starting in 2009.

References

External links
Just Sports Stats

1985 births
Living people
Sportspeople from Kinshasa
Canadian football linebackers
Western Michigan Broncos football players
Calgary Stampeders players
Black Canadian players of American football
Democratic Republic of the Congo emigrants to Canada
Democratic Republic of the Congo players of American football
Democratic Republic of the Congo players of Canadian football
Fernand
Canadian people of Democratic Republic of the Congo descent